Caculé is a Brazilian municipality located in the state of Bahia, which possesses 23,291 inhabitants , according to IBGE. It is situated 750 kilometers southwest from Salvador. Its economy is based mostly on agriculture. The climate in Caculé is warm and dry during the day, being cooler at night, at about 15 °C. The "Rio Antônio" (river Antônio) crosses the city. Although it presently has no operational railroad station, Caculé is midpoint on the Ferrovia Centro Atlântica railroad route connecting Montes Claros to Salvador, Bahia.

References

External links
Caculé website

Municipalities in Bahia